Karem may refer to:

People
Abraham Karem (born 1937), an aerospace engineer and UAV pioneer
Arfa Karem (1995–2012), Pakistani student and computer prodigy
Brian Karem, American journalist 
David Karem (born 1943), American politician
Robert Karem, American government official 
Karem Achach, (born 1991), Mexican synchronized swimmer
Karem Ben Hnia (born 1994), a Tunisian Olympic weightlifter
Karem Mahmoud (1922–1995), Egyptian singer and actor
Karem Shivaji (born 1978), Indian politician and activist

Other uses
 Karem Aircraft, an American aerospace company
 Carem or Karem, a place mentioned in the Septuagint translation of the Hebrew Bible

See also

Karey (disambiguation)
Karim, and variant spellings, a name
Ein Karem, or ʿAyn Kārim, a neighbourhood in Jerusalem